Chlidichthys smithae is a species of fish in the family Pseudochromidae.

Description

Distribution and habitat
Chlidichthys smithae is found near Mauritius in the Indian Ocean.

Etmyology
The fish is named in honor of Margaret Mary Smith (1916-1987), who was the first director of the J.L.B. Smith Institute of Ichthyology which is now the South African Institute for Aquatic Biodiversity. Smith helped collect the type specimen.

References

Fricke, R., 1999. Fishes of the Mascarene Islands (Réunion, Mauritius, Rodriguez): an annotated checklist, with descriptions of new species. Koeltz Scientific Books, Koenigstein, Theses Zoologicae, Vol. 31:759 p. 

Pseudoplesiopinae
Taxa named by Roger Lubbock
Fish described in 1977